012 may refer to:

 Tyrrell 012, a Formula One racing car
 The dialing code for Pretoria, South Africa

See also
 12 (disambiguation)